Ameny was an ancient Egyptian vizier under Middle Kingdom king Amenemhat II, around 1900 BC, in the Twelfth Dynasty. Ameny appears on the fragment of an annal stone of the king. The fragment was found by Flinders Petrie in Memphis and mentions a statue of this vizier. Ameny is perhaps also known from an offering table. However, the name Ameny belongs to the most common names of the Middle Kingdom. Therefore, the identity of both people on these objects is far from certain.

Literature 
Wolfram Grajetzki: Court Officials of the Egyptian Middle Kingdom, London 2009 p. 30

External links 
image of the annal stone fragment

Viziers of the Twelfth Dynasty of Egypt
20th-century BC people